In 2015, the maiden spaceflights of the Chinese Long March 6 and Long March 11 launch vehicles took place.

A total of 87 orbital launches were attempted in 2015, of which 82 were successful, one was partially successful and four were failures. The year also saw seven EVAs by ISS astronauts. The majority of the year's orbital launches were conducted by Russia, the United States and China, with 27, 20 and 19 launches respectively.

Overview
In February 2015, the European Space Agency's experimental lifting body spacecraft, the Intermediate eXperimental Vehicle, successfully conducted its first test flight.

In March 2015, Ceres became the first dwarf planet to be visited by a spacecraft when Dawn entered orbit. In July 2015, New Horizons visited the Pluto-Charon system after a 9-year voyage, returning a trove of pictures and information about the former "ninth planet" (now classified as a dwarf planet). Meanwhile, the MESSENGER probe was deliberately crashed into Mercury after 4 years of in-orbit observations.

On 23 November 2015, the Blue Origin New Shepard suborbital rocket achieved its first powered soft landing near the launch site, paving the way for full reuse of its propulsion stage. On 21 December, the maiden flight of the SpaceX Falcon 9 Full Thrust took place, ending with a successful landing of its first stage.

Two old weather satellites, NOAA-16 and DMSP 5D-2/F13, broke up in 2015, creating several hundred pieces of space debris. In both cases, a battery explosion is suspected as the root cause.

Orbital launches 

|colspan=8 style="background:white;"|

January 
|-

|colspan=8 style="background:white;"|

February 
|-

|colspan=8 style="background:white;"|

March 
|-

|colspan=8 style="background:white;"|

April 
|-

|colspan=8 style="background:white;"|

May 
|-

|colspan=8 style="background:white;"|

June 
|-

|colspan=8 style="background:white;"|

July 
|-

|colspan=8 style="background:white;"|

August 
|-

|colspan=8 style="background:white;"|

September 
|-

|colspan=8 style="background:white;"|

October 
|-

|colspan=8 style="background:white;"|

November 
|-

|colspan=8 style="background:white;"|

December 
|-

|}

Suborbital flights 

|}

Deep space rendezvous

Extra-Vehicular Activities (EVAs)

Space debris events

Orbital launch statistics

By country
For the purposes of this section, the yearly tally of orbital launches by country assigns each flight to the country of origin of the rocket, not to the launch services provider or the spaceport. For example, Soyuz launches by Arianespace in Kourou are counted under Russia because Soyuz-2 is a Russian rocket.

By rocket

By family

By type

By configuration

By spaceport

By orbit

Gallery

References

Footnotes 

 
Spaceflight by year